La Ferté-Loupière is a commune in the Yonne department in Bourgogne-Franche-Comté in north-central France. The village is famous for its danse macabre, dating back from the beginning of the 16th century, in the church of Saint-Germain.

See also
Communes of the Yonne department

References

Communes of Yonne